Titus at a Lectern or Titus at his Desk is a 1655 portrait by Rembrandt of his son Titus van Rijn, which has been in the Museum Boijmans Van Beuningen since 1939.

Sources
collectie.boijmans.nl

External link

Paintings of children
1655 paintings
Portraits by Rembrandt
Paintings in the collection of the Museum Boijmans Van Beuningen